Beirne is an unincorporated community and census-designated place (CDP) in southern Clark County, Arkansas, United States. It was first listed as a CDP in the 2020 census with a population of 36.

History
Beirne was first settled in 1880 by James Lewis Beirne of Grafton, Illinois on  that he had purchased.  Within a year there was a planing mill and a store, along with a railroad depot to serve the area.

In 1890 the community was known alternately as Beirne or Beirne Station.

By 1897, Beirne had at least two saw mills that made lumber for furniture and other uses.

Lumber is still the main industry in Beirne, with Anthony Timberlands having their hardwood operation there.

Transportation
State Highway 51 passes north–south through the Beirne.

For rail freight Beirne is served by the Union Pacific Railroad, which passes through the community and has a spur into the Anthony Timberlands lumber mill.

Demographics

2020 census

Note: the US Census treats Hispanic/Latino as an ethnic category. This table excludes Latinos from the racial categories and assigns them to a separate category. Hispanics/Latinos can be of any race.

References

Unincorporated communities in Arkansas
Unincorporated communities in Clark County, Arkansas
Census-designated places in Clark County, Arkansas
Census-designated places in Arkansas
Populated places established in 1880
1880 establishments in Arkansas